Hovea corrickiae, is a species of flowering plant in the family Fabaceae and is endemic to south-eastern Australia. It is a shrub or slender tree with densely hairy branchlets, narrowly egg-shaped or elliptic, dark green leaves with stipules at the base, and mostly pale to deep mauve, pea-like flowers.

Description
The upper surface of the leaves is glossy dark green, the lower surface densely hairy.

Taxonomy and naming
Hovea corrickiae was first formally described in 1990 by James Henderson Ross in the journal, Muelleria from specimens collected in the Western Grampians by Margaret Georgina Corrick in 1983. The specific epithet (corrickiae) honours the collector of the type specimens.

Distribution and habitat
This species of pea grows in open forest with a dense shrub layer and occurs in scattered populations in north-eastern Tasmania and in high rainfall areas in and near the Grampians in Victoria.

References

corrickiae
Flora of Victoria (Australia)
Flora of Tasmania
Fabales of Australia
Plants described in 1990